Leo White (born November 3, 1957) is a former Army Officer and two time member of the US olympic judo team. White is one of the winningest judoka in US history. White currently holds the rank of 8th degree black belt in judo.

Personal life
White was the son of a retired Army Sergeant and attended Monterey Peninsula College.  White attended ROTC and graduated from Cumberland College in 1980.  In 1984, he competed in the Olympics as a Captain in the Army. White along with Bob Byrd implemented a judo program in Atlanta as an option outside of serving time for minor criminal offenses. White has been described as a gentleman and outstanding competitor.  He married  judo competitor Jackie White in 1993  and is currently the coach at Wakamusha Judo Club.

Judo
White started judo at the age of 10 in Monterey California at the Monterey Judo, Jujitsu Academy and was instructed by sensei Bernard Baptista. At age 18 he won the 1976 United States Judo Federation Young Men's Championships. White won the collegiate championships in 1976 as well as the 1980 Pan Am's and AAU Nations. White won a silver in the 1981 CISM games. In 1982, White won two Golds in the World Military Judo Championships. White was a member of the US Team that won the Dutch Open in 1983. White became a 1983 Black Belt Magazine Hall of Fame Competitor of the Year. In 1983, White beat out Brewster Thompson for a berth at the 1984 Olympics. White was on the 1984 US Olympic Team as well as the 1992 US Olympic Team.

References

American male judoka
Living people
Olympic judoka of the United States
Judoka at the 1984 Summer Olympics
Judoka at the 1992 Summer Olympics
United States Army officers
Judoka trainers
1957 births
Pan American Games medalists in judo
Pan American Games silver medalists for the United States
Pan American Games bronze medalists for the United States
Judoka at the 1979 Pan American Games
Judoka at the 1983 Pan American Games
Judoka at the 1987 Pan American Games
Judoka at the 1991 Pan American Games
Medalists at the 1979 Pan American Games
Medalists at the 1983 Pan American Games
Medalists at the 1987 Pan American Games
Medalists at the 1991 Pan American Games